Michael Devaney  may refer to:

 Michael Devaney (racing driver) (born 1984), Irish racing driver
 Michael Devaney (runner) (1891–1967), American track and field athlete

See also
 Michael Delaney (disambiguation)